Northwest Local School District may refer to:

Northwest Local School District (Hamilton County), Hamilton County, Ohio
Northwest Local School District (Scioto County), Scioto County, Ohio
Northwest Local School District (Stark County), Stark County, Ohio